Graphosia lophopyga is a moth of the family Erebidae. It was described by Alfred Jefferis Turner in 1940. It is found in Australia.

References

External links

Lithosiina
Moths described in 1940